Gift from the Sea is a book by Anne Morrow Lindbergh first published in 1955.

While on vacation on Florida's Captiva Island in the early 1950s, Lindbergh wrote the essay-style work by taking shells on the beach for inspiration and reflecting on the lives of Americans, particularly American women, in the mid-20th century.  She shares her meditations on youth and age, love and marriage, peace, solitude, and contentment during her visit.

Themes
Sometimes classified as inspirational literature, the book presages many of the themes in that genre of popular literature: simplicity, solitude, and caring for the soul.

Reception
Gift from the Sea has sold over 3 million copies and has been translated into 45 languages. According to Publishers Weekly, the book was the top nonfiction bestseller in the United States for 1955.

References

External links
From One Life to Another, Spiritual Connections Light Up Our Journey  at Read the Spirit

1955 non-fiction books
American non-fiction books
Books by Anne Morrow Lindbergh
English-language books